Khine Mar Lar Hnin Si is a 1992 Burmese drama film, directed by Win Oo and Kyi Soe Tun starring Win Oo, Yan Aung, Khin Than Nu, Myint Myint Khine, Khine Khin Oo and Kyaw Ye Aung. During its filming, director and actor Win Oo died, and was replaced by director Kyi Soe Tun and actor Yan Aung. It premiered in November 27, 1992.

Cast
Win Oo
Yan Aung
Khin Than Nu
Myint Myint Khine
Khine Khin Oo
Kyaw Ye Aung

References

1992 films
1990s Burmese-language films
Burmese drama films
Films shot in Myanmar
1992 drama films